Abrostola agnorista is a moth of the family Noctuidae. It is found in Romania, ex-Yugoslavia, Albania, Bulgaria, Greece, Italy, France and Hungary.

The wingspan is 24–32 mm. Adults are on wing from May to September in two generations depending on the location.

The larvae feed on Parietaria officinalis and Urtica species.

External links

Fauna Europaea
Lepiforum.de

Plusiinae
Moths of Europe
Moths described in 1956